Ralph Sadleir (1579 – 12 February 1661) of Standon, Hertfordshire was an English landowner. He was Sheriff of Hertfordshire in 1609.

He was the eldest son, and heir, of Sir Thomas Sadleir (c. 1536 – 1607), lord of the manor of Standon, by his second wife, Gertrude, daughter of Robert Markham, of Cotham, Nottinghamshire.

On 13 September 1601 he married Anne Coke (1585 – , the eldest daughter of Sir Edward Coke (1552 – 1634) and his first wife, Bridget Paston (d. 1598), daughter of John Paston of Norwich. Standon Lordship, the manor house where the couple lived after their marriage, was built for his grandfather and namesake, the statesman, Sir Ralph Sadler (or Sadleir) (1507–1587). 

Sadleir delighted in hawking, hunting and the pleasures of country life; was famous for his noble table, his great hospitality to his neighbours, and his abundant charity to the poor. Isaac Walton in his "The Compleat Angler" noted how Sadleir was attached to the diversion of hunting. "To-morrow morning we will meet a pack of otter dogs of noble Mr. Sadler's, upon Amwell Hill, who will be there so early, that they intend to prevent the sun rising." In Walton's account, hounds met an hour before sunrise. Ralph Sadleir states that he will have the otter's skin, worth 10 shillings, for gloves "the best defence against wet weather". The otterhound pack that Ralph established evolved into the Essex Otter Hounds eventually becoming, through amalgamation, the Eastern Counties Otter Hounds, then the Eastern Counties Mink Hounds, following the ban on otter hunting, surviving to this day as the Eastern Counties Mink Hunt.

He died without issue on 12 February 1661 and was buried in the parish church at Standon. His death brought to an end the male line of the Sadleir family. The Standon estate was inherited by his nephew, Walter (1609 – 1678), eldest surviving son of his sister, Gertrude, who married Walter Aston, 1st Lord Aston of Forfar (1584–1639).  His widow continued to live at Standon until her death in late 1571 or early 1572.

 
Although there are elaborate monuments for his father and grandfather, no monument was erected for him, unless, as Major Sadleir-Stoney suggests, it was one that stands at the east side of the chancel, of which the brass has been taken away.

References

Sources

External links

St Mary's Church, Standon, Hertfordshire at Flickr
Ancient Monuments - Parish Church of St Mary, Standon 

1579 births
1661 deaths
High Sheriffs of Hertfordshire
Ralph